

League Information 
The Maryland Student Hockey League is an association of over 50 school-based teams located in Maryland and the District of Columbia. It is a registered 501(c)3 corporation and a member of the Potomac Valley Amateur Hockey Association which is the local governing body of USA Hockey, the National Governing Body of amateur ice hockey in the United States. The sanctioned varsity teams are divided into sections used by every sport under MSHL. The League sponsors Varsity and Junior Varsity competition of all skill levels and sexes.  While not affiliated with the Maryland Public Secondary School Athletic Association, the MSHL follows many of the MPSSAA's rules and regulations as possible, given the constraints imposed by the various schools and school systems. The sanctioned teams compete from the beginning of November until the end of February with the maximum number of games.

Playoff Format 
The MSHL State Playoffs consists of 16 teams. Each conference is allocated a set number of teams in the tournament as follows:
Montgomery Hockey Conference (1st division only) - 4 teams,
Eastern Conference - 4 teams,
Howard County Scholastic Hockey Association - 3 teams,
Monocacy Valley Hockey League - 3 teams,
Southern Conference - 2 teams,
Each conference determines which teams are their entrants and in what order they are seeded within the conference.
Teams are then entered into pods:
Pod 1:  Montgomery #1, Eastern #1, Howard #1, MVHL #1, Southern #1,
Pod 2:  Montgomery #2, Eastern #2, Howard #2, MVHL #2, Southern #2,
Pod 3:  Montgomery #3, Eastern #3, Howard #3, MVHL #3,
Pod 4:  Montgomery #4, Eastern #4.
Seeds within a pod are determined by a blind draw. Teams in Pod 1 are seeded 1 to 5, Pod 2 - 6 to 10, Pod 3 - 11 to 14 and Pod 4 - seeds 15 and 16.
Teams will then be entered in the bracket and the only adjustments permitted for the 1st round are that teams from the same conference will not face each other in round 1.
Other than the instance(s) described above, there is no reseeding of the tournament before each round.
Dates for the 2018 State playoffs are as follows:
Round 1 - February 12–16, 2018 at various rinks,
Quarterfinals - February 20 at Laurel,
Semifinals - February 22 at Laurel,
Finals - February 26 at Laurel.

History

MSHL Teams

References
Maryland Scholastic Hockey League Website

High school ice hockey in the United States
High school sports in Maryland
Ice hockey in Maryland